Argentina egedei, known as Eged's silverweed, is a flowering perennial plant in the rose family, Rosaceae. It is a salt-tolerant plant native to arctic and cool temperate coasts of the Northern Hemisphere, most commonly growing in salt marshes. The southern limits of the range are California and Long Island, New York in North America, and the Baltic Sea and coastal eastern Siberia in Eurasia. It is also sometimes called "Pacific silverweed", though this usually refers to Argentina pacifica and in any case does not describe the range of Eged's Silverweed well.

It was formerly classified in the genus Potentilla as Potentilla egedei. It is considered a member of the Argentina anserina species aggregate, or is alternatively treated as a subspecies of A. anserina by some botanists.

Eged's Silverweed is a low-growing herbaceous plant with creeping red stolons up to 80 cm long. The leaves are 10–40 cm long, evenly pinnate into in crenate leaflets 3–5 cm long and 2 cm broad, thinly covered with a few silky white hairs. The sparsity of the hairs is a useful distinction from A. anserina, which is more densely hairy.

The flowers are produced singly on 5–15 cm long stems, 2–3.5 cm diameter with five yellow petals. The fruit is a cluster of dry achenes.

References

External links

egedei